The 1989 Halloween Havoc was the inaugural Halloween Havoc professional wrestling pay-per-view (PPV) event produced by World Championship Wrestling (WCW) under the National Wrestling Alliance (NWA) banner. It took place on October 28, 1989, at the Philadelphia Civic Center in Philadelphia, Pennsylvania. As the name implies, it was a Halloween-themed event.

Eight matches were contested on the event. The main event was a Thunderdome match pitting Ric Flair and Sting against Terry Funk and The Great Muta. Flair and Sting won when Funk and Muta's manager Gary Hart threw in the towel for his team.

Production

Background
In 1989, World Championship Wrestling (WCW) of the National Wrestling Alliance (NWA) scheduled a Halloween-themed pay-per-view event for October 28, 1989, at the Philadelphia Civic Center in Philadelphia, Pennsylvania. The event was aptly named Halloween Havoc.

Storylines
The event featured wrestlers from pre-existing scripted feuds and storylines. Wrestlers portrayed villains, heroes, or less distinguishable characters in the scripted events that built tension and culminated in a wrestling match or series of matches.

Aftermath
Ric Flair's feud with Terry Funk ended at Clash of Champions IX when Flair made Funk submit to the figure-four leglock in an "I Quit" match, then Gary Hart's J-Tex corporation began a full-scale feud with Fiair and Sting, but in early December Arn Anderson returned from the WWF and joined Flair, Sting, and Ole Anderson to reform the Four Horsemen.  Tommy Young's long refereeing career in the NWA ended in November, 1989, during a TV taping of WCW Saturday Night when Tommy Rich knocked Young to the mat and into the ropes during a match, legitimately injuring his neck.

A second Halloween Havoc was scheduled for the following year, thus establishing Halloween Havoc as an annual PPV for WCW until 2000 (the 1989 and 1990 events were also the only two Halloween Havocs produced by WCW under the NWA as in January 1991, WCW split from the NWA). The 2000 event was the final Halloween Havoc produced by WCW, as in March 2001, WCW was acquired by the World Wrestling Federation (WWF); the WWF was renamed WWE in 2002. In 2020, after 19 years since the acquisition of WCW, WWE revived Halloween Havoc as an annual event for their developmental brand, NXT.

Results

References

External links
Halloween Havoc 1989 results

Halloween Havoc
1989 in Pennsylvania
Events in Philadelphia
Professional wrestling in Philadelphia
1989 World Championship Wrestling pay-per-view events
Holidays themed professional wrestling events